Françoise Makaya is a Gabonese politician. She is a member of the Gabonese Democratic Party (Parti démocratique gabonais, PDG) and a Deputy in the National Assembly of Gabon.

Following the death of President Omar Bongo in June 2009, Makaya said in reference to the succession of Senate President Rose Francine Rogombe: "We saw the [swearing in] ceremony with some satisfaction because she's a woman but there was also plenty of emotion and tears because of the president's death".

References

Members of the National Assembly of Gabon
Gabonese Democratic Party politicians
Living people
Year of birth missing (living people)
21st-century Gabonese people